Xin-She Yang is a Senior Research Scientist at National Physical Laboratory, best known as a developer of  various heuristic algorithms for engineering optimization. He obtained a DPhil in applied mathematics from Oxford University. He has given invited keynote talks at SEA2011, SCET2012, BIOMA2012 and Mendel Conference on Soft Computing (Mendel 2012). He has been elected as a Fellow of the Institute of Mathematics and its Application in 2021. He has been on the prestigious list of Highly Cited Researchers since 2016 by Clarivate Analyatics/Web of Science.

Algorithms
He created the firefly algorithm (2008),  cuckoo search (2009), bat algorithm (2010), and flower pollination algorithm (2012).

Since 2009, more than 1000 peer-reviewed research papers cited the firefly algorithm and/or cuckoo search.

References

Further reading 
Yang, X.-S. (2014), Nature-Inspired Optimization Algorithms, Elsevier.
 Full text of Yang's doctoral thesis, "Mathematical modelling of compaction and diagenesis in sedimentary basins", Oxford Research Archive

Living people
21st-century British mathematicians
Alumni of Corpus Christi College, Oxford
Year of birth missing (living people)

Fellows of the Institute of Mathematics and its Applications